Bursa corrugata (gaudy frog shell) is a species of sea snail, a marine gastropod mollusk in the family Bursidae, the frog shells.

The subspecies Bursa corrugata lineata Nowell-Usticke, 1959 has become a synonym of Bursa granularis (Röding, 1798)

Distribution
This marine species occurs in the Atlantic Ocean off West Africa, the Canary Islands, Cape Verdes and Brazil; in the Caribbean Sea, the Gulf of Mexico and the Lesser Antilles.

Description 
The maximum recorded shell length is 75 mm.

Habitat 
Minimum recorded depth is 2 m. Maximum recorded depth is 137 m.

References

 Bernard, P.A. (Ed.) (1984). Coquillages du Gabon [Shells of Gabon]. Pierre A. Bernard: Libreville, Gabon. 140, 75 plates
 Rosenberg, G., F. Moretzsohn, and E. F. García. 2009. Gastropoda (Mollusca) of the Gulf of Mexico, Pp. 579–699 in Felder, D.L. and D.K. Camp (eds.), Gulf of Mexico–Origins, Waters, and Biota. Biodiversity. Texas A&M Press, College Station, Texas.
 Gofas, S.; Afonso, J.P.; Brandào, M. (Ed.). (S.a.). Conchas e Moluscos de Angola = Coquillages et Mollusques d'Angola. [Shells and molluscs of Angola]. Universidade Agostinho / Elf Aquitaine Angola: Angola. 140 pp.
 Rolán E., 2005. Malacological Fauna From The Cape Verde Archipelago. Part 1, Polyplacophora and Gastropoda.

External links
 

Bursidae
Gastropods described in 1811
Molluscs of the Atlantic Ocean
Molluscs of Brazil
Molluscs of the Canary Islands
Molluscs of Angola
Gastropods of Cape Verde